Jo Dee Marie Messina (born August 25, 1970) is an American country music artist. She has charted six number-one singles on the Billboard country music charts. She has been honored by the Country Music Association and the Academy of Country Music, and has been nominated for two Grammy Awards. She was the first female country artist to score three multiple-week number-one songs from the same album. To date, she has two platinum and three gold-certified albums by the RIAA.

Messina debuted in 1996 with the single "Heads Carolina, Tails California." Her album was certified gold by the RIAA. Her second album, I'm Alright, produced five top-10 country hits between 1998 and 1999, and sold over a million copies in America. Since her debut, six of her singles have peaked at number one on the Billboard country singles chart and five of her albums have received a certification by the RIAA or the CRIA. She has sold over 5 million records worldwide.

Early life
Jo Dee Marie Messina was born on August 25, 1970, in Framingham, Massachusetts, to Vincent and Mary Messina. Her father, of Italian descent, and mother, of Irish descent, raised her in Holliston, Massachusetts, alongside sisters, Terese and Marianne, and a brother, Vincent. At an early age, Messina's love for music blossomed. She drew influence from a variety of country music artists, including Patsy Cline, Reba McEntire, and The Judds. By age 16, she was playing local clubs, singing while her brother and sister provided backup on drums and guitar.  The group continued performing until Jo Dee graduated from high school.

Realizing that living in the Northeast would limit her chances of achieving country music stardom, Messina moved to Nashville, Tennessee, at age 19. She worked various temporary jobs, including computer programming and accounting, while entering talent contests around Nashville.

One win led to a regular gig on the radio show Live at Libby's, which caught the interest of producer Byron Gallimore, who helped her assemble a demonstration tape. Gallimore was also working with the young Tim McGraw around the same time, and Messina befriended him. Backstage at one of his concerts, McGraw met an executive from his label, Curb Records, and jokingly suggested that they needed a redhead. With the help of fellow Curb producer James Stroud, Messina was soon signed to the record label. Gallimore and McGraw later became co-producers of Messina's studio albums for Curb.

Music career

1996–97: Country success

Messina released her self-titled debut album in 1996. It spawned two top-10 hits, starting with the lead single, "Heads Carolina, Tails California", which peaked at number two on the country charts and its follow-up, "You're Not in Kansas Anymore" gained similar success.
However, the two additional singles released from the album, "Do You Wanna Make Something of It" and "He'd Never Seen Julie Cry" peaked outside the country top 40 and were minor hits between 1996 and 1997. Following her major success, Messina performed 215 shows in 1996 and became one of the most successful new female vocalists of the 1990s. Her debut album sold over 500,000 copies and was certified gold by the RIAA.

Messina's finances suffered due to a series of poor business decisions and a change of management that led her to nearly declaring bankruptcy; she nearly lost her home and her car. She spent nearly a year trying to write new songs and material for a new album that could help bring herself out of bankruptcy.  She credited the radio success of "Bye, Bye" and "I'm Alright" with giving her a "second chance".

1998−2006: Breakthrough success
Messina released her second album in 1998, I'm Alright. The album spawned three number-one hit singles on the Billboard Country Chart that year: "Bye, Bye";
"I'm Alright"; and "Stand Beside Me", all three of which charted on the Billboard Hot 100, as well. The fourth single, "Lesson in Leavin", was a cover of  Dottie West's 1980 number-one country hit. The song peaked at number two for seven weeks.  In 1999, she had another top-10 hit from the album, "Because You Love Me", which peaked at number eight on the Billboard Country Chart.

In 2000, Messina received the Country Music Association's Horizon Award, which is awarded to new country music artists. She also won the Billboard "Most Played Female at Country Radio", and won three major awards from the Boston Music Awards, located in her home state of Massachusetts.

Messina's album became her biggest-selling album to date, selling over two million copies in the US, receiving an RIAA certification of double platinum. She released her third studio album, Burn in 2000, which aimed towards country pop-styled music.  The album's lead single, "That's the Way" peaked at number one on the Billboard Country Chart and also became her highest-charting single on the Billboard Hot 100, peaking at number 25. Following that success, she had two additional top-10 hits with "Burn" and "Downtime".

Messina had another number-one hit from the album in 2001 with "Bring On the Rain", a duet with Tim McGraw that also became a top-10 hit on the Adult Contemporary Chart, peaking at number six. In addition to headlining concerts, she also toured with Vince Gill, George Strait, and The Judds' reunion tour.

Messina released her first holiday album in 2002 with A Joyful Noise. The title track was released as a single and peaked at number 16 on the adult contemporary chart in 2003. The album consisted of remakes of established holiday songs.
Messina planned to release a new album in 2003, but a Greatest Hits album was released, instead, due to delays. The album covered most of Messina's hits between 1996 and 2003, and also included four new songs, including two that were released as singles. The first, "Was That My Life", peaked in the top 25 and the second, "I Wish", became a top-15 hit. The album was also certified gold by RIAA.

In 2005, Messina released her first country music studio album since 2000, Delicious Surprise. It peaked at number one on the Billboard Top Country Albums chart and number 9 on Billboard 200.  It sold over 500,000 copies and became her fourth album to receive an RIAA gold certification.  The lead single, "My Give a Damn's Busted" (co-written by country music star Joe Diffie), peaked at number one on the Billboard Country Chart and became Messina's first number-one single since 2001. The three follow-up singles - "Delicious Surprise (I Believe It)" "Not Going Down," and "It's Too Late To Worry" - were minor top-40 hits on the Billboard country chart between 2005 and 2006.

2007–2012: Unmistakable

Messina released a new single in July 2007, "Biker Chick", from her fifth studio album, Unmistakable. It was written by Kelly Archer and Max T. Barnes and was recorded in the fall of 2006 in Nashville.
Although the album was set for release on November 6, 2007, it was shelved, and the single was dropped from country radio after spending 9 weeks on the charts, rising to a peak of number 48.

On March 22, 2008, Messina released her second single from Unmistakable, titled "I'm Done". The single peaked at number 34 on the Billboard Country Chart. Messina, who co-wrote the song, explained that the release of the album was "truly dictated by the success of the single."
On June 10, 2008, Messina and Phil Vassar opened the 2008 CMA Music Festival, where she performed her two number-one hits, "Bye, Bye" and "I'm Alright", both co-written by Vassar.

She performed her latest single, "I'm Done", which received a positive reaction from the audience that day. In early 2009, she released Shine, but at the last minute, her record label decided not to release it, and the album was pushed back again.

In January 2010, Messina released the single, "That's God", although it failed to chart. Messina began debuting the single in late 2009 on her Music Room Series tour. "My heart is exploding with excitement. This song is truly what I want to say. I believe in it and its message." Having had her first child in January 2009, Messina was inspired to write the song while spending time with her son on a trip to Jasper, Canada, where she saw mountains with glacier lakes. The single received a negative review at Engine 145, where critic Sam Gadzidak thought that it was derivative of Lee Ann Womack's "There Is a God".

She later announced that the album would be released in a trilogy of extended plays, beginning with Unmistakable: Love, released on April 27, 2010. It was followed by two additional extended plays, Drive and Inspiration, both released on November 9, 2010, in MP3 format.

In 2011, Messina signed to promote the WD-40 line of cleaners with a campaign called "Unmistakably Clean". A collection of her songs is available for free download with the purchase of specially marked Spot Shot, Carpet Fresh, 2000 Flushes, or X-14.

In 2012, Messina was featured on the fourth season of Bravo's hit reality show The Real Housewives of Atlanta. On the show, Messina and cast member Kandi Burruss collaboratively wrote a song, Burruss' first effort at creating country music. In December 2012, she completed her 17-year contract with Curb Records.

2013–present: Independent Label, Dreambound Records 
In May 2013, Messina started a Kickstarter campaign to fund her next album. The lead single, "Peace Sign", was released on August 23, 2013, by Dreambound Records. The full-length album, Me, was released on March 18, 2014, featuring 12 new songs. "A Woman's Rant" and "He's Messed Up" were released in 2014 as the second and third singles from the album, respectively, and Messina embarked on the Me Tour in support of the album in October 2014.

Messina has been performing new self-penned songs "Will You Love Me" and "Masquerade" at shows since 2015. While Messina anticipated that they would be a part of a new EP, entitled Masquerade, she has since reassessed the direction of her music and is continuing to write new material, mostly faith-based in an effort to share God's word, for an eventual project.

In April 2018, Messina appeared on Huckabee on Trinity Broadcasting Network, to debut her new song, written by Messina with producer Seth Mosley, "Bigger Than This". The song caught the attention of the country music and Christian music industries, giving Messina the opportunity to bring new tracks to existing fans, while also introducing herself into an entirely new space. To follow up her faith-based, original song, Messina released her own version of Cory Asbury's award-winning "Reckless Love" to country and Christian radio.

Personal life
Messina became involved with the Special Olympics after stumbling across an event while jogging.  She has become an ambassador and performs at Special Olympics events  to increase attendance.

In 2004, Messina was engaged to road manager Don Muzquiz, but then broke off the engagement. However, the two remained in a business relationship. On June 22, 2007, Messina announced her engagement to businessman Chris Deffenbaugh from New Mexico.  They were married in Nashville in late 2007.

A son was born January 2009. In January 2012, they welcomed another son.

On September 6, 2017, Jo Dee Messina's team revealed she had been diagnosed with an unspecified cancer. All 2017 tour dates after October 7 were postponed as she underwent treatments in the fall. She resumed touring in March 2018 and continues to add tour dates to her website regularly. She successfully recovered from the cancer diagnosis and resumed touring in 2022.

Discography

Studio albums
 1996: Jo Dee Messina
 1998: I'm Alright
 2000: Burn
 2005: Delicious Surprise
 2014: Me

EPs & Other albums
 2002: A Joyful Noise
 2003: Greatest Hits
 2010: Unmistakable: Love
 2010: Unmistakable: Drive
 2010: Unmistakable: Inspiration

Singles
 2016: Noel
 2018: Bigger Than This
 2018: Reckless Love

Awards & honors

Grammy Awards 
The Grammy Awards are awarded annually by the National Academy of Recording Arts and Sciences. Messina has been nominated twice.

Other awards 
In addition to her two Grammy Award nominations, Messina has also won an Academy of Country Music Award, a Billboard Magazine Award, three Boston Music Awards, and a Country Music Association Award.

|-
| rowspan=3| 1998
| Academy of Country Music Awards
| Top New Female Vocalist
| 
|-
| rowspan=2| Country Music Association Awards
| Horzion Award
| 
|-
| Music Video of the Year - "Bye, Bye"
| 
|-
| rowspan="5"|1999
| Billboard Magazine
| Most Played Country Female Artist of the Year
| 
|-
| Billboard Magazine
| Outstanding Country Act
| 
|-
| Billboard Magazine
| Outstanding Female Vocalist
| 
|-
| rowspan=4| Country Music Association Awards
| Horizon Award
| 
|-
| rowspan=2| Female Vocalist of the Year
| 
|-
| 2000
| 
|-
| 2002
| Vocal Event of the Year - "Bring On the Rain"
|

Notes

References
 Gilbert, Calvin. (1998). "Jo Dee Messina". In The Encyclopedia of County Music. Paul Kingsbury, Editor. New York: Oxford University Press. p. 343.

External links 

 Jo Dee Messina Official Website
 
 Interview with Jo Dee Messina

1970 births
American country guitarists
American country pianists
American women pianists
American country singer-songwriters
American women country singers
American people of Irish descent
American people of Italian descent
Country musicians from Massachusetts
Country pop musicians
Curb Records artists
Living people
People from Holliston, Massachusetts
People from Framingham, Massachusetts
Singer-songwriters from Massachusetts
Guitarists from Massachusetts
21st-century American women singers
20th-century American women singers
21st-century American pianists
21st-century American women guitarists
21st-century American guitarists
20th-century American singers
21st-century American singers